Cloghran  may refer to:

 Cloghran, Castleknock - a civil parish in the barony of Castleknock in Fingal, Ireland 
 Cloghran, Coolock - a civil parish in the barony of Coolock in Dublin, Ireland